Ayman Al-Enazy (born 18 July 1973) is a Kuwaiti swimmer. He competed in the 1992 Summer Olympics in the men's 100 metre breaststroke and men's 200 metre breaststroke events.

References

1973 births
Living people
Swimmers at the 1992 Summer Olympics
Kuwaiti male swimmers
Olympic swimmers of Kuwait
Male breaststroke swimmers